Harry Olszewski (October 11, 1946 – April 27, 1998) was an American football offensive lineman. He played college football at Clemson University and was a consensus All-American in 1967.

1946 births
1998 deaths
Players of American football from Baltimore
Clemson Tigers football players
Montreal Alouettes players